The 2017–18 DEL2 season was the fifth season since the founding of the DEL2, the second tier of German ice hockey, set below the Deutsche Eishockey Liga. The season ran from 15 September 2017 till 22 April 2018. SC Riessersee was crowned league premiers by finishing top of the regular season standings. Bietigheim Steelers claimed the championship title by defeating SC Riessersee 4-1 in the final series. Bayreuth Tigers lost the relegation playoffs 4-1 against promoted team Tölzer Löwen, however they were saved from relegation from DEL2 to Oberliga due to SC Riessersee not being granted a DEL2 licence in the summer of 2018.

Modus

Fourteen teams competed in the 2017–18 DEL2 regular season. Tölzer Löwen was promoted from Germany's third division, Oberliga. Each team played each other twice in the regular season, home and away, for a total of 52 matches each. The top six teams directly qualified for the championship playoffs, played in a best of seven format. Teams placed seven to ten advanced to the championship playoff qualifiers, which followed a best of three format. The bottom four teams enter the relegation playoffs. The two losing teams from round 1 face off in the relegation final with the losing team being relegated to Oberliga.

The DEL2 champion does not automatically get promoted to DEL. In September 2015, the DEL and DEL2 agreed to reintroduce promotion and relegation between the two leagues from the 2017–18 season onwards. The DEL2 champion would then have the opportunity to be promoted, provided it fulfilled the licensing requirements of the DEL, while the last-placed DEL club would be relegated.

Regular season

Results

The cross table represents the results of all matches of the regular season. The home team is listed in the middle column, the visiting team in the top row.

Note: O Overtime; S Shootout

Standings

Points rules: 3 points for regulation win; 2 points for OT or SO win; 1 point for OT or SO loss; 0 points for regulation loss 
Tie-break rules: 1) points; 2) head-to-head points; 3) head-to-head goal difference; 4) head-to-head number of goals scored. 
(C) Champions; (P) Premiers; (R) Relegated 
Source:

Top scorers

Source:

Top goaltenders

Note: To qualify for this list, goaltenders need to have played a minimum of 20 matches 
Source:

Playoffs

Championship
The championship play-offs:

The qualifiers for the playoffs ran between 6 March 2018 to 9 March 2018. Four teams (7v10 and 8v9) competed in best of three series’. The two winning teams advanced to the championship playoffs. In 2018, the two lower ranked teams in the qualifiers, ETC Crimmitschau and Heilbronner Falken, won their series and advanced to the playoffs. Dresdner Eislöwen and Ravensburg Towerstars were knocked out and their season ended.

The championship playoffs ran between 13 March 2018 to 22 April 2018. Eight teams competed in best of seven series'. The series winning teams advanced through from the quarter-finals to the final. In 2018, the top two seeds SC Riessersee and Bietigheim Steelers each won their quarter and semi-finals to reach the final. The Steelers defeated the league premiers 4-1 in the finals series to secure the division 2 championship title, their second DEL2 championship trophy.

Note: All numbers represent series results, not a match score

Relegation
The relegation play-offs:

The relegation playoffs is contested between the four teams who finish bottom of the regular season standings. Run between 13 March 2018 and 6 April 2018, the four teams play best of seven series’. The teams that lose their first round advance to the second round. The winners secure their DEL2 status and avoid relegation. Whoever loses the second round is relegated to Oberliga. The 2018 edition would have seen Bayreuth Tigers relegated to Oberliga after losing their first round series 3-4 against Lausitzer Füchse before losing in five matches against Tölzer Löwen in the second round. However the Tigers were saved from relegation due to SC Riessersee not being granted a DEL2 licence in the summer of 2018. Instead, Riessersee was subsequently relegated to Oberliga.

Note: All numbers represent series results, not a match score

References

External links

 Official website
 Official Facebook
 Elite Prospects home

2017–18 in European second tier ice hockey leagues
2017-18 DEL2
2017–18 in German ice hockey